The Gibson-Burnham House is a historic house at 1326 Cherry Street in Pine Bluff, Arkansas.  It is a roughly L-shaped two story wood-frame structure, with a hip roof across its front and a gabled rear section.  A single-story porch extends across the front, supported by Ionic columns.  Its interior has well-preserved original woodwork, including notable a staircase built out of quarter-sawn oak and displayed at the 1904 St. Louis World's Fair.  Built in 1904 by a local plantation owner, it is a fine local example of Colonial Revival architecture.

The house was listed on the National Register of Historic Places in 1991.

See also
National Register of Historic Places listings in Jefferson County, Arkansas

References

Colonial Revival architecture in Arkansas
Houses in Pine Bluff, Arkansas
Houses on the National Register of Historic Places in Arkansas
National Register of Historic Places in Pine Bluff, Arkansas